Tomas Tamošauskas (born 22 May 1983) is a Lithuanian football manager and a former midfielder.

Club career
Tamošauskas began his career at Banga Gargždai in 2000. In 2001, he moved to FK Atlantas where he scored the club's consolation goal in their UEFA Cup 2002-03 qualifying round match against Bulgarian club, PFC Litex Lovech which they lost 3–1.

He then moved to Russia to play for Dynamo Moscow in 2003 where he made just one league appearance and played mostly reserve team football. On 10 February 2005 he moved back to Lithuania with FBK Kaunas on loan from Dynamo Moscow.

In 2006, he moved to Latvia to play for Liepājas Metalurgs. On 16 August 2007 he scored the winning goal for Metalurgs in their 3–2 win over Swedish club, AIK in their 2007-08 UEFA Cup second qualifying round match. From summer 2009 to 2012 Tomašauskas was the captain of Liepājas Metalurgs.

In January 2013 Tomašauskas moved to the Latvian Higher League club Daugava Rīga. At the start of 2014 he returned to Lithuania, joining Klaipėdos Granitas. He left the team in July the same year.

International career
Tamošauskas has played for the Lithuanian Under-21 team and the Lithuania national team 18 times, scoring 1 goal.

Honours
Club
 Latvian Cup winner (1): 2006
 Baltic League winner (1): 2007
 Latvian Higher League champion (1): 2009

References

External links

1983 births
Living people
Lithuanian footballers
People from Gargždai
Lithuanian expatriate footballers
Lithuania international footballers
FK Atlantas players
FBK Kaunas footballers
FK Liepājas Metalurgs players
FC Dynamo Moscow players
FK Daugava (2003) players
Expatriate footballers in Latvia
Lithuanian expatriate sportspeople in Latvia
Expatriate footballers in Russia
Russian Premier League players
Lithuanian football managers
FK Banga Gargždai managers
Association football midfielders